The Longleaf Trace is a  paved pedestrian, equestrian, rollerblade, and bicycle trail located between Hattiesburg and Prentiss, Mississippi, USA. The Trace was constructed in 2000. It follows a portion of the abandoned Mississippi Central Railroad line. It has nine stations along its route (Prentiss, Ed Parkman Road, Carson, Bassfield, Lott Circle, Sumrall, Epley, Clyde Depot, Jackson Road).
The following roads hold a rest stop and parking lot accessing the Trace. In Hattiesburg: University of Southern Mississippi, West 4th street and Jackson Road.

The slope of the Trace is very gradual, rising 50 ft / mi at the steepest accessible segment. Rest stops are provided around every two miles, and weather stops are located at reasonable distances. Mile markers ease navigating the trail.

Wildlife such as wild hare, squirrels, raccoons, song birds and deer can be seen along the trace. The trace also supports a variety of flora, including flowering Dogwood and Magnolia trees, and fragrant honeysuckle and wisteria. Many of the trees between Hattiesburg and Sumrall have identification signposts.

External links 
 Longleaf Trace website

Sources 

Protected areas of Forrest County, Mississippi
Hiking trails in Mississippi
Protected areas of Jefferson Davis County, Mississippi
Protected areas of Lamar County, Mississippi
National Recreation Trails in Mississippi